Omar Santiago Andrade Terán (born 16 June 1986) is an Ecuadorian football manager and former player who played as a winger. He is the current manager of Universidad Católica del Ecuador's youth setup.

References

External links
 Omar Andrade profile at Federación Ecuatoriana de Fútbol;  
 
 

1986 births
Living people
People from Ibarra, Ecuador
Ecuadorian footballers
Association football wingers
L.D.U. Quito footballers
C.D. ESPOLI footballers
Imbabura S.C. footballers
C.D. Olmedo footballers
C.D. Cuenca footballers
S.D. Quito footballers
S.D. Aucas footballers
C.D. Clan Juvenil footballers
Ecuadorian football managers
C.D. Universidad Católica del Ecuador managers